Aberdeen City Council is the local government authority for the city of Aberdeen, Scotland. It was created in 1996, under the Local Government etc. (Scotland) Act 1994, though a sense of Aberdeen as a city, with its own city council, can be traced back to 1900, when the county of the city of Aberdeen was created.

From 1900 to 1975 the area and its administrative body were called ‘The County of the City of Aberdeen’ but unofficially either as ‘Aberdeen Corporation’, 'The Corporation of Aberdeen', ‘Corporation of the City of Aberdeen’ or (more rarely) ‘Aberdeen City Council’.

In 1975, under the Local Government (Scotland) Act 1973, counties of cities were abolished. The area of the former county of a city was combined with Bucksburn, Dyce, Newhills, Old Machar, Peterculter and the Stoneywood areas of the county of Aberdeen, and the Nigg area of the county of Kincardine, (including Cove Bay) to form the Aberdeen district of the Grampian region. The title of the administrative body was then "City of Aberdeen District Council."

This district became the now existing unitary council area in 1996. On 9 May 1995, by resolution under section 23 of the Local Government (Scotland) Act 1973, the City of Aberdeen Council changed the name of the local government area of "City of Aberdeen" to "Aberdeen City". and the administrative body's title to "Aberdeen City Council."

Composition

Aberdeen City Council currently comprises 45 councillors, who represent the city's wards, and is headed by the Lord Provost. Prior to the 2012 council election there were 43 members of Aberdeen City Council.

Between 2003 and 2007, the council was under the control of a Liberal Democrat and Conservative coalition, holding 23 of the 43 seats on the council. Prior to the 2003 election, the council had been considered a Labour stronghold. Following the May 2007 election, contested for the first time using a system of proportional representation, the Liberal Democrats and Scottish National Party (SNP) formed a coalition to run the council, holding 27 of the 43 seats (following an SNP by election gain from the Conservatives on 16 August 2007, the coalition held 28 of the 43 seats). Two Liberal Democrat councillors became independents during this period due to personal controversies, while the four strong Conservative group split in August 2010, with two councillors forming the Scottish Conservative Group and two others the Aberdeen Conservative Group.

After the May 2012 election, the control of the council shifted back to the Labour Party, supported in a coalition by three Conservative and three Independent councillors, giving the administration 23 seats.

The Labour/Conservative/Independent coalition continued after the 2017 election, but with a change in the balance of power within the coalition. Labour were reduced to nine councillors (subsequently suspended from membership by the Scottish Labour Party for forming a coalition with the Conservatives), whilst the Conservatives had eleven councillors elected. These Conservative and suspended "Aberdeen Labour" councillors were joined in coalition by three Independent councillors, one of who had left the Liberal Democrats just days after the council election.

In December 2019 a councillor elected as a Conservative became an Independent following his conviction for sexual assault. This led to the ruling coalition becoming a minority administration comprising only 22 of the 45 councillors.

Between 2017 and 2021 the council had Co-Leaders Douglas Lumsden (Conservative) and Jenny Laing (“Aberdeen Labour”) as a result of the coalition agreement. Following Douglas Lumsden's election to the Scottish Parliament in May 2021 Jenny Laing became sole Leader of the council.

Following the 2022 election, the political composition of Aberdeen City Council became:

 Scottish National Party: 20
 Labour: 11
 Conservatives: 8
 Liberal Democrats: 4
 Independent: 2

After negotiations, the SNP and Liberal Democrats agreed to form a partnership to lead the Council for the next five years. At the Council's statutory meeting on 18 May 2022, SNP councillor David Cameron was elected Lord Provost and Liberal Democrat Councillor Steve Delaney was elected Depute Provost. SNP Group Leader Alex Nicoll and Liberal Democrat Group Leader Ian Yuill became Co-Leaders of the Council.

Officers:
 Council Co-Leaders: Alex Nicoll and Ian Yuill
 Lord Provost of Aberdeen: David Cameron
 Chief Executive: Angela Scott
 Director of Resources: Stephen Whyte
 Chief Officer - Governance: Fraser Bell

Council structure
Before May 2007, councillors represented 43 single-member wards election on a first-past-the-post basis.

On 3 May 2007, the single transferable vote system was used for the first time and multi-member wards were introduced, each ward electing three or four councillors. The Local Government Boundary Commission for Scotland completed its final recommendations for new wards for all the council areas of Scotland.

Aberdeen is divided into 13 multi-member wards, electing a total of 45 councillors. This system was introduced as a result of the Local Governance (Scotland) Act 2004, and is designed to produce a form of proportional representation.

Current multi-member ward system

As of 4 May 2017, the current wards and representative numbers are:

Election results

2022

2017

2012

2007

References

External links

Politics of Aberdeen
Local authorities of Scotland
Organisations based in Aberdeen